The Barrington River is a tidal extension of Runnins River in the U.S. states of Rhode Island and Massachusetts. It flows approximately 6 km (4 mi). There are no dams along the river's length.

History
It has also historically been important for shellfishing and boating. Since May 1998, the river has been permanently closed to fishing due to fecal coliform pollution.

Course
The river begins at Hundred Acre Cove which is fed to the north by Runnins River which is where the river flows into Seekonk, Massachusetts. The river then flows southeast to Barrington where it converges with the Warren River.

Crossings
Below is a list of all crossings over the Barrington River. The list starts at the headwaters and goes downstream.
Barrington
Massasoit Avenue
County Road (RI 103/114)

See also
Hundred Acre Cove, Barrington’s quintessential salt water marshes home to Osprey nests and Terrapin turtle nesting sites in this wide open ecosystem that serves as a filtration system to Narragansett Bay. Great Blue Herons and Snowy Egrets dot the banks and landscape of the tidal marsh.
List of rivers in Rhode Island
Runnins River

References 
Maps from the United States Geological Survey

Rivers of Providence County, Rhode Island
Rivers of Bristol County, Rhode Island
Rivers of Bristol County, Massachusetts
Narragansett Bay
Barrington, Rhode Island
Seekonk, Massachusetts
Rivers of Massachusetts
Rivers of Rhode Island